José Alberto Rodríguez Calderón (born 23 October 1961) is a Mexican politician affiliated with the PRI. As of 2013 he served as Deputy of the LXII Legislature of the Mexican Congress representing Hidalgo as replacement of Jesús Murillo Karam.

References

1961 births
Living people
Politicians from Pachuca, Hidalgo
Institutional Revolutionary Party politicians
21st-century Mexican politicians
Deputies of the LXII Legislature of Mexico
Members of the Chamber of Deputies (Mexico) for Hidalgo (state)